Zalaszentgróti VFC is a football club based in Zalaszentgrót, Hungary. The team competes in the Megyei Bajnokság I, the fourth tier of Hungarian football.

Name changes
1920–?: Zalaszentgróti SE
?-1945: Zalaszentgróti Levente Egyesület
1945–1948: Zalaszentgróti SE
1948–1950: Zalaszentgróti EPOSz
1950–1951: Zalaszentgróti DISz
1951–1964: Zalaszentgróti Traktor
1964–1994: Zalaszentgróti Spartacus SE
1994–2015: Zalaszentgróti Városi Futball Club
2015–2017: Tisza-Ép Sipospékség Zalaszentgróti Városi Futball Club
2017–2018: Tisza-Ép Zalaszentgróti Városi Futball Club
2018–present: Zalaszentgróti Városi Futball Club

Honours
Megyei Bajnokság I, Zala:
Champion: 2012–13

References

External links
 Profile on Magyar Futball

Football clubs in Hungary